Mohali, officially known as Sahibzada Ajit Singh Nagar, is a planned city in the Mohali district in Punjab, India, which is an administrative and a commercial hub lying south-west of Chandigarh. It is the headquarters of the Mohali district. It is also one of the six Municipal Corporations of the State.  It was officially named after Sahibzada Ajit Singh, the eldest son of Guru Gobind Singh.

Mohali has developed rapidly as an IT hub of the state of Punjab, and has thus grown in importance. 
The Government of Punjab has initiated significant infrastructure and recreation projects in attempts to increase the standard of living in Mohali. Roads have been built to create networks between Mohali and Chandigarh International Airport to boost its international connectivity.

Mohali was earlier a part of the Rupnagar district and was carved out and made a part of a separate district in 2006.

History

Early history
Prehistoric evidence has been found in Mohali and its surrounding regions. Due to the presence of the lake, fossil remains with imprints of a large variety of aquatic plant, animal, and amphibian life have been found. As a part of the Punjab region, it has many rivers in the areas where it is speculated that ancient and primitive settlements by humans began. Some 8,000 years ago, the area was also known to be a home to the Harappans.

Medieval history
Mohali means settlement. The village of Mohali was a part of the Sikh Empire.

The village Lambian, located in the city, was visited by Guru Har Rai, the 7th Guru of the Sikhs. A battle took place here between the British and 500 Sikhs under the command of Akali Hanuman Singh, in which Akali Hanuman Singh attained martyrdom.

Modern history
After the partition of India in 1947, the former British province of Punjab was split between east Punjab in India and west Punjab in Pakistan. The Indian Punjab required a new capital city to replace Lahore, which became part of Pakistan during partition. Consequently, the government made Chandigarh from nearly 50 Puadhi speaking villages of the then state of East Punjab, India.

Mohali was conceived after the trifurcation of Punjab and its capital Chandigarh became a Union Territory in the late 1960s. In 1967, the area around Mohali Village was initially developed as an industrial estate; this was broadened with residential areas to meet housing demands. The township plan for Mohali was put forward by the All India Congress Committee during the annual session held in 1975 at Mohali. On 1 November 1975, Punjab Chief Minister Giani Zail Singh laid the foundation stone of Mohali township and named it Sahibzada Ajit Singh Nagar.
It was rechristened to Ajitgarh by the union government in the year 2012, as it was felt at that time that the name, SAS Nagar, was too long

City design
Mohali and Chandigarh are contiguous, with only the boundary between Punjab and Chandigarh dividing this area. The original plan of Mohali township is an extension of the road and an 800m x 1200m extension of the sector design system of Chandigarh, without any unique planning.

The first 11 sectors of the sector design system for Mohali are popularly known as Phases. Early development was only till Phase 7. The development of sectors and phases from Phase 8 onwards started in the late 1980s, the city received its bus stand during Phase 8 in the mid-1990s. Some sectors of Chandigarh are shared between Chandigarh and Sahibzada Ajit Singh Nagar, like the sectors 48, 51, 52, 54,56,61 and 63. 63 onwards sectors fall in the Sahibzada Ajit Singh Nagar region.
phase 1 = sector 55
phase 2 = sector 56
phase 3=  Sector 57
phase 4 = sector 58
phase 5 = sector 59
phase 6 = sector 60
phase 7 = sector 61
phase 8 = sector 62
phase 9 = sector 63
phase 10 = sector 64

Greater Mohali Area Development Authority master plan
In the GMADA master plan, the city has up to 128 Sectors which include nearby villages. They are, among others,
Alipur,
Bairampur,
Bakarpur,
Ballo Majra,
Balongi,
Bari,
Bar Majra,
Bathlana,
Behlol,
Bhago Majra,
Chajju Majra,
Chaparchiri,
Daun,
Desumajra,
Dyalpur,
Harlalpur,
Jandpur,
Jhampur,
Jheureri,
Jhungian,
Kailon,
Kandala,
Khuni Majra,
Kishanpura,
Kurali,
Landiali,
Landran,
Manakmajra,
Manana,
Matran,
Naraingarh,
Pattlin,
Raipur Kalan,
Sambalki,
Saneta,
Santemajra,
Shafipur,
Siaun,
Sihanpur,
Sukhgarh,
Tapauli and
Thaska.
GMADA also includes the Aerocity which is a gateway to Mohali International Airport.
Also IT City Mohali has emerged as one of the best location for residences and corporate offices under GMADA. It is spread over 1,600 acres and includes sectors 82, 82A, and 83A. The IT city aims to produce at least 40,000 jobs. With allotment to top IT companies and state of the art infrastructure for residential projects. With futuristic planning and due the location advantage, IT City Mohali is understandably the distinguished locality in Tricity.

Chandigarh Tricity
Mohali and Panchkula are two satellite cities of Chandigarh. The trio of these three cities is collectively known as Chandigarh Tricity. Panchkula is a planned city adjoining Chandigarh in Panchkula District, Haryana, India.

Climate

Sahibzada Ajit Singh Nagar has a sub-tropical continental monsoon climate characterised by a seasonal rhythm: hot summers, slightly cold winters, unreliable rainfall and great variation in temperature. In winter, frost sometimes occurs during December and January. The city also receives occasional winter rains from the west.

Average temperature
Winter: Average temperatures in winter (November to February) remain at (maximum)  and (minimum) .
Spring: spring temperatures vary between (min)  (max).

Demographics
As per 2011 census, Mohali's urban agglomeration (metropolitan area) had a population of 176,152, out of which males were 92,407 and females were 83,745. The effective literacy rate (7+ years) was 93.04% per cent. The sex ratio of Mohali is 906 females per 1,000 males.

Sikhism is the majority religion in Mohali which is followed by 51.53% of the people. Hinduism is the second most followed religion which is adhered to by 45.55% of the people. Minority religions like Islam and Christianity are followed by 1.68% and 0.79% of the population, with 0.45% are Buddhists, Jains and others.

Politics and government

The Deputy Commissioner, an officer belonging to the Indian Administrative Service, is the overall in charge of the General Administration in the Districts of India. Currently, Girish Dayalan is serving as Deputy Commissioner. The civic administration in Mohali under the Municipal Corporation (established 1984), a body of elected councillors and is headed by a Commissioner chosen from the elected members.

Sahibzada Ajit Singh Nagar is a Municipal Corporation, with Kulwant Singh as the first mayor, with the current being Amarjoit Singh since April 2021. The district administration is under the supervision of Current Administrator Gurpreet Kaur Sapra, Deputy Commissioner (IAS). Sahibzada Ajit Singh Nagar is part of Anandpur Sahib Parliamentary Constituency, represented by Manish Tewari since 2019, while in Punjab Legislative Assembly, Sahibzada Ajit Singh Nagar is represented since 2012 by MLA Balbir Singh Sidhu from Congress. Before 2012, Sahibzada Ajit Singh Nagar was part of the Kharar Assembly Constituency. In the 2012 Punjab Legislative Assembly election, a new Assembly Constituency was carved out in the name of Mohali (as Sahibzada Ajit Singh Nagar was known during Assembly Elections 2012). Sahibzada Ajit Singh Nagar is also represented in Shiromani Gurdwara Parbandhak Committee (SGPC) by Paramjit Kaur Landran and Hardeep Singh. The seat was reserved for women during the 2011 SGPC Elections.

Transport

Road 

The main bus stand of this city is located in Sector 56, where many private bus operators provide services within different cities of the state. Chandigarh Transport Undertaking (CTU) provides bus connectivity with the rest of the Tricity.

Auto-rickshaws ply throughout the city.

Rail 
Mohali Railway Station is situated in Industrial Area, Phase 11 and connects the city with several important locations in the region such as Delhi, Ludhiana and Amritsar, as well as other parts of the country.

Air 
Chandigarh International Airport is also known as Mohali International Airport and is located near Aerocity in Mohali. It has both domestic and international flights.

Economy

Mohali's economy is largely manufacturing-based, the major companies in the region include Punjab Tractor Limited (PTL), ICI Paints, and Punjab Communications Limited. Telecommunications service providers including Tata Communications, Vodafone and the Godrej Group operate within SAS Nagar. SAS Nagar's role in facilitating multinational corporations is growing, with contributions from global tech giants such as Quark and Philips.

Denver-based Quark, Inc. has created a $500M,  QuarkCity in SAS Nagar, complete with a residential complex comprising 30% of the area; the shopping, entertainment, medical and educational districts consume another 10%. It was designed to generate 25,000 direct and 100,000 indirect jobs. It also includes a Special Economic Zone (SEZ).

The region has been targeted by an increasing number of outsourcing IT companies.

Sports
Mohali contributes greatly to sports within the Punjab region, with 8 multipurpose sports complexes equipped with facilities for sports like field hockey, cricket, swimming, Table Tennis, Athletics, Volleyball, Badminton, Tennis, etc. It has an International Cricket Stadium and another upcoming Mullanpur International Cricket Stadium. It also home to the Mohali International Hockey Stadium.

Cricket

In 1990, the Punjab Cricket Association (PCA) unveiled a plan to build a state-of-the-art facility complete with a separate practice ground—to be built in a swampy area in the city.  The PCA invested heavily in the ground, a swimming pool, health club, tennis court, library, restaurant, and bar and outdoor & indoor cricket practice nets were incorporated into the plans.

The construction of the stadium took around ₹25 crores and 3 years to complete. The stadium has an official capacity of 30000 spectators. The stadium was designed by Arun Loomba and Associates, Panchkula and constructed by R.S. Construction Company, Chandigarh. The lights here are unconventional compared to other cricket stadiums, in that the light pillars are very low in height. This is to avoid aircraft from the nearby airport colliding with the light pillars. The stream passing through the central part of Chandigarh called N Choe, also passes alongside the stadium.

PCA Stadium is home of Punjab Kings (IPL Mohali franchisee). The current pitch curator for the PCA Stadium is Daljit Singh and the design consultant is Ar. Sufyan Ahmad.

Hockey
The city has the International Hockey Stadium which serves as the home ground for the hockey club, Punjab Warriors, of Hockey India League.

Places of interest

Places of tourist interest in and around this region include the following:
 Fateh Burj

Religious places

Gurudwara Amb Sahib 

Gurudwara Amb Sahib is a historical shrine situated in Sector 62, Mohali commemorates the visit of the 7th Guru of Sikhs, Guru Har Rai. The place also commemorates the meeting of Guru Har Rai with his famous Sikh Bhai Kuram, a Labana trader. This shrine is managed by SGPC, Amritsar.

Shri Shiv Mandir 
 

Shri Shiv Mandir is an old Hindu temple dedicated to Shiva, situated in Phase1.

Gurudwara Singh Shaheedan 
 
This shrine is situated in the village Sohana, close to Sector 70 constructed in memory of the martyrdom of Jathedar Baba Hanuman Singh, a Nihang Jathedar. He, along with 500 Sikhs, attained martyrdom at this place in a battle against British forces during the Anglo-Sikh Wars.

Dera Dargah Sharif Bakarpur 

This shrine is situated in the village Bakarpur, in Aerocity, near Mohali Airport. This shrine is home of Ali and five Pirs. Sai Surinder Singh is currently the chief dera head of this Dargah.

Parks and gardens
 Nature Park, Phase 8
 Rose Garden, Phase 3B1
 Bougainvillea Garden, Phase 4
 Silvy Park, Phase 10
 Valley Park, Phase 8
 Ekta Park, Phase 7 (Near Chawla Chowk) Mohali
 Musical Fountain Park, Sector 70
 City park, sector 68

Markets and other places 
 Main Market, Phase - 7,  SAS Nagar
 Main Market, Phase - 4,  SAS Nagar
 Main Market, Phase - 3,  SAS Nagar
 Main Market, Phase - 1,  SAS Nagar
 Main Market, Phase - 5,  SAS Nagar
 Main Market, Phase - 10,  SAS Nagar
 Punjab Cricket Association Stadium,  SAS Nagar
 International Hockey Stadium, Phase-9
 Gurudwara Amb Sahib, Phase - 8

Chowks of Mohali 
The famous chowks of Mohali, which replicate one of the best features of the city are:
 YPS Chowk
 Diplast Chowk
 Airport Chowk

Upcoming developing areas
 Aerocity, Mohali
 Aerotropolis, Mohali

Other Nearby Places 
 Sikh Ajaibghar, Sector 119, Village Balongi, Village Bar Majra
 VR Punjab, Kharar 
 Gurudwara Nabha Sahib - Zirakpur

Education

 Schools
 Gian Jyoti Public School, Phase 2, Mohali
 Gurukul World School, Sector-69, Mohali
 Learning Paths School, Sector 67, Mohali
 Shivalik Public School, Mohali
 The British School, Sector 70
 Yadavindra Public School, Sector 51, Mohali

 Universities
Chandigarh University  NH-95, Chandigarh-Ludhiana Highway, Mohali

 Science and Medical Colleges
 Dr. B.R. Ambedkar State Institute of Medical Sciences (AIMS, Mohali)
 Indian Institute of Science Education and Research, Mohali (IISER Mohali)

 Engineering colleges
 GGS College of Modern Technology
 Indo Global Colleges
 Shaheed Udham Singh College of Engineering & Technology
 Chandigarh Engineering College

 Business Schools
 Indian School of Business (ISB), Sector 81
 Amity University, Sector 82A, IT City, Mohali
 Plaksha University, Sector 83A, IT City, Mohali

 Law Schools
 Army Institute of Law
 Universal Law College

 Pharmacy
 National Institute of Pharmaceutical Education and Research, Mohali (NIPER)

Healthcare

The city has several speciality hospitals. Government dispensaries also are present in some sectors. Dr. B.R. Ambedkar State Institute of Medical Sciences Of phase 6 is the oldest government hospital in the city and the new hospital is in Sector 66.

The city has many multi-facility private hospitals like the Max Super Speciality Hospital, Fortis Hospital, Silver Oak Hospital, Ivy Hospital, Indus Super Speciality Hospital, Mayo Hospital, Cheema Medical Complex, Mukat Hospital and Heart Institute, Cosmo Hospital, Amar Hospital, Grecian Super Speciality Hospital, Sohana Hospital, Ace Heart and Vascular Institute, SGHS Hospitals, AM Hospital, ESI Hospital & Regional Spinal Injury Center (Sector 70). Pharmacies such as City Medicos have also situated near Fortis and Silver Oaks hospital.

See also
 New Chandigarh

References

External links
 
 

 
Planned cities in India
2006 establishments in Punjab, India